XHJRS-FM is a radio station on 95.1 FM in Jalpa, Zacatecas, Mexico. The station is owned by Grupo Radiofónico ZER and is known as Caxcán FM.

History
XHJRS was permitted on November 30, 2011.

References

Radio stations in Zacatecas
Radio stations established in 2011